The 1993 Mercedes Cup,  was a men's tennis tournament played on outdoor clay courts and held at the Tennis Club Weissenhof in Stuttgart, Germany that was part of the Championship Series of the 1993 ATP Tour. It was the 16th edition of the tournament was held from 19 July until 25 July 1993. Sixteenth-seeded Magnus Gustafsson won the singles title.

Finals

Singles

 Magnus Gustafsson defeated  Michael Stich, 6–3, 6–4, 3–6, 4–6, 6–4
 It was Gustafsson's 1st singles title of the year and 5th of his career.

Doubles

 Tom Nijssen /  Cyril Suk defeated  Gary Muller /  Piet Norval, 7–6, 6–3

References

External links
 Official website 
 ITF tournament edition details
 ATP tournament profile

Stuttgart Open
Stuttgart Open
1993 in German tennis